Hepner is a surname. Notable people with the surname include:

 Adolf Hepner (1846–1923), German-American writer
 Darcy Hepner (born 1954), Canadian-American saxophonist
 Fred Hepner (born 1940), Australian footballer
 Jean Hepner (born 1958), American tennis player
 Lee Hepner (1920–1986), Canadian orchestral conductor
 Linda Hepner (born 1949), Canadian politician
 Rachel Dübendorfer (née Hepner, 1900–1973), anti-Nazi resistance fighter
 Urmas Hepner (born 1964), Estonian footballer

See also
 Hepner Hall
 Hepner-Bailey Field at Adamson Stadium
 Heppner (disambiguation)